Whitelaw was a railway station on the South Gippsland line in Victoria, Australia.

No evidence of the station remains: all buildings, platforms, sidings and other rail infrastructure were removed from the site in the late 1960s, a few years after the station's official closure.

References

Disused railway stations in Victoria (Australia)
Transport in Gippsland (region)
Shire of South Gippsland